This article displays the squads of the teams that competed in EuroBasket 2017. Each team consists of 12 players.

Age and club as of the start of the tournament, 31 August 2017.

Group A

Finland

France

Greece

Iceland

Poland

Slovenia

Group B

Georgia

Germany

Israel

Italy

Lithuania

Ukraine

Group C

Croatia

Czech Republic

Hungary

Montenegro

Romania

Spain

Group D

Belgium

Great Britain

Latvia

Russia

Serbia

Turkey

See also
 EuroBasket 2015 squads
 EuroBasket 2021 squads

References

External links
 

Squads
2017